The 2012 Asian Weightlifting Championships was held at Yichung Culture & Sports Center in Pyeongtaek, South Korea between April 24 and April 30, 2012. It was the 43rd men's and 24th women's championship.

Medal summary

Men

Women

Medal table 

Ranking by Big (Total result) medals 

Ranking by all medals: Big (Total result) and Small (Snatch and Clean & Jerk)

Team ranking

Men

Women

Participating nations 
239 athletes from 28 nations competed.

 (13)
 (14)
 (1)
 (15)
 (10)
 (8)
 (8)
 (8)
 (15)
 (3)
 (9)
 (2)
 (13)
 (14)
 (2)
 (1)
 (2)
 (4)
 (8)
 (15)
 (1)
 (9)
 (1)
 (13)
 (12)
 (12)
 (13)
 (13)

Men's results

56 kg

62 kg

References

 Results
 Results Book

External links
Official Website

Asian Weightlifting Championships
Asian
W
International weightlifting competitions hosted by South Korea